Deathline (Redline) is a 1997 science fiction, action film starring Rutger Hauer and Yvonne Sciò. It was also released under the titles Redline and Armageddon. A Canadian-Dutch co-production it was filmed mainly in Hungary.

Plot

Wade, Marina and Merrick smuggle goods in from America to a decadent high tech Russia in the near future. On his last job, Wade and his girlfriend are murdered by Merrick.

Realizing he might have some worth, Wade's body is brought back to life by a secret Russian military organisation. He later escapes from a hospital and, helped by Katya who is a double of Marina, goes after Merrick.

However Merrick used the money he stole to buy himself powerful new friends. It also turns out that Merrick is just a pawn in a bigger game with a group that plans on taking Russia over.

Cast
 Rutger Hauer as John Anderson Wade
 Mark Dacascos as Merrick
 Yvonne Scio as Marina K / Katya
 Patrick Dreikauss as Mishka
 Randall William Cook as Special Prosecutor Vanya Dzerzhinsky
 Michael Mehlman as Serge
 Ildiko Szucs as Antonia
 Istvan Kanizsai as Assistant Prosecutor
 John Thompson as Minister of Defence Udo
 Gabor Peter Vincze as Lieutenant Lo
 Scott Athea as Brat
 Atilla Apra as Yamoto
 Jak Osmond as Assassin
 Roger La Page as Beggar
 Agnes Banfalvi as Russian President
 Gábor Nagy as Priest

References

External links

1997 films
1990s science fiction action films
Canadian science fiction action films
English-language Canadian films
English-language Dutch films
1990s English-language films
Films directed by Tibor Takács
1990s Canadian films